Yury Shapkin (born 1 June 1987 in Moscow) is a Russian freestyle skier, specializing in  aerials.

Shapkin was entered at the 2010 Winter Olympics for Russia, but pulled out before the qualifying round of the aerials event.

Shapkin made his World Cup debut in December 2007. As of March 2013, his best finish in a World Cup event is 13th, at a 2009/10 at Calgary. His best World Cup overall finish in aerials is 26th, in 2007/08.

References

1987 births
Living people
Skiers from Moscow
Russian male freestyle skiers
Universiade bronze medalists for Russia
Universiade medalists in freestyle skiing
Competitors at the 2009 Winter Universiade